Ary Chalus (born 6 December 1961, in Pointe-à-Pitre) is a  French politician from Guadeloupe.  He was the mayor of Baie-Mahault from April 2001 to December 2015. He was the deputy for Guadeloupe's 3rd constituency in the National Assembly of France from 2012 to 2017, as a member of the GUSR.

On 11 May 2021 Ary Chalus was placed in police custody as part of a preliminary investigation for breach of trust, complicity in the embezzlement of public funds and illegal financing of an electoral campaign.

References

External links

  Biography on the French National Assembly website

1961 births
Living people
People from Pointe-à-Pitre
Black French politicians
Guadeloupean politicians
United Guadeloupe, Solidary and Responsible politicians
Deputies of the 14th National Assembly of the French Fifth Republic
Presidents of the Regional Council of Guadeloupe
Mayors of places in Guadeloupe